Arbrå BK is a Swedish football club located in Arbrå.

Background
Arbrå BK currently plays in Division 4 Hälsingland, the sixth tier of Swedish football. They play their home matches at the Rengsjö IP in Arbrå.

The club is affiliated to Hälsinglands Fotbollförbund.

The women's soccer team played in the Swedish top division in 1981.

Season to season

In their most successful period Arbrå BK competed in the following divisions:

In recent seasons Arbrå BK have competed in the following divisions:

Footnotes

External links
 Arbrå BK – Official website

Sport in Gävleborg County
Football clubs in Gävleborg County
1928 establishments in Sweden
Association football clubs established in 1928